The Professorship of Mineralogy was a professorship at the University of Cambridge. It was founded in 1808 and discontinued when its final holder retired in 1931. It was replaced by the Professorship of Mineralogy and Petrology.

Professors of Mineralogy
 Edward Daniel Clarke (1808)
 John Stevens Henslow (1822)
 William Whewell (1828)
 William Hallowes Miller (1832)
 William James Lewis (1881)
 Arthur Hutchinson (1926-1931)

References

Professorships at the University of Cambridge
Department of Earth Sciences, University of Cambridge
1808 establishments in England